Otoyol 32, also known as the İzmir-Çeşme Motorway, or just as the Çeşme Motorway and abbreviated as the O-32 is a  long toll motorway located entirely within the İzmir Province in Turkey. The O-32 runs from Balçova, İzmir to the coastal resort town of Çeşme on the Karaburun Peninsula. The motorway connects to the O-30 (İzmir Beltway) in Izmir.

The motorway serves towns situated on the southern shore of the Gulf of İzmir as well as summer houses and resort towns towards its western end. The campus of the İzmir Institute of Technology (İYTE) is located just off the O-32 as well as the İzmir Technology Development Zone

History 
Construction of the İzmir-Çeşme Motorway began in December 1989. The first section between Balçova and Urla was opened to traffic on 4 July 1992. The fifth and final section was completed on 24 August 1996.

Exit list

See also
 List of highways in Turkey

References

32
Transport in İzmir Province
Toll roads in Turkey